The Roads to Sata, written in 1985 by Alan Booth, tells the story of his journey in 1977, on foot, from Cape Sōya in Hokkaidō, the northernmost point of Japan, to Sata, the southernmost point of the main islands of Japan. Booth's journey lasted 128 days and covered 2,000 miles. The book was originally published by John Weatherhill Inc in 1985, but was republished by Kodansha Globe in 1997 in paperback.

References 

British travel books
Books about Japan
English non-fiction books